A bottling company is a commercial enterprise whose output is the bottling of beverages for distribution.

Many bottling companies are franchisees of corporations such as Coca-Cola and PepsiCo who distribute the beverage in a specific geographic region. Some bottling companies may also bottle other local beverages such as regional beers or wines.

A bottler is a company which mixes drink ingredients and fills up cans and bottles with the drink.  The bottler then distributes the final product to the wholesale sellers in a geographic area. Large companies like The Coca-Cola Company sell their product to bottlers like the Coca-Cola Bottling Co. Consolidated, who then bottle and distribute it.

See also
 List of bottling companies
 Bottling line

References